Nicotinamide mononucleotide (“NMN” and “β-NMN”) is a nucleotide derived from ribose, nicotinamide, nicotinamide riboside and niacin. In humans, several enzymes use NMN to generate nicotinamide adenine dinucleotide (NADH). In mice, it has been proposed that NMN is absorbed via the small intestine within 10 minutes of oral uptake and converted to nicotinamide adenine dinucleotide (NAD+) through the Slc12a8 transporter. However, this observation has been challenged, and the matter remains unsettled.

Because NADH is a cofactor for processes inside mitochondria, for sirtuins and PARP, NMN has been studied in animal models as a potential neuroprotective and anti-aging agent. The reversal of aging at the cellular level by inhibiting mitochondrial decay in presence of increased levels of NAD+ makes it popular among anti-aging products. Dietary supplement companies have aggressively marketed NMN products, claiming those benefits. However, no human studies to date have properly proven its anti-aging effects. Single-dose administration of up to 500 mg was shown safe in men in a study at Keio University School of Medicine, Shinjuku, Tokyo, Japan. One 2021 clinical trial found that NMN improved muscular insulin sensitivity in prediabetic women, while another found that it improved aerobic capacity in amateur runners.

Nicotinamide riboside (NR) kinase enzymes are essential for exogenously administered utilization of NR and NMN. Some research suggests when administered exogenously, NMN must be converted to NR in order to enter a cell and be re-phosphorylated back to NMN.

The molecular structures of NMN and NR are similar. Compared to NR, NMN is monophosphorylated at the 5' position. Due to its larger size and charge, it is believed that NMN cannot cross cellular membranes and must convert to NR before entering cells, where NAD+ biosynthesis occurs. Otherwise, NMN would need to be transported into cells by a transporter specific for NMN, possibly Slc12a8.

Both NR and NMN are vulnerable to extracellular degradation by CD38 enzyme, which can be inhibited by compounds such as CD38-IN-78c.

References

Nucleotides
Ribosides
Nicotinamides
Life extension